Frankfurt am Main is a major city in Hesse, Germany.

Frankfurt may also refer to:

Places

Germany
 Frankfurt (Oder), Brandenburg, on the Polish border
 Bezirk Frankfurt, a district of the German Democratic Republic (1952–1990)
 Frankfurt, a village in Markt Taschendorf, Bavaria
 Frankfurt, a settlement in Wanzleben, Saxony-Anhalt

Frankfurt am Main
 Free City of Frankfurt, (until 1806) within the Holy Roman Empire of the German Nation  
 Grand Duchy of Frankfurt (1810–1813)
 Free City of Frankfurt, (1815–1866) an independent city-state and member of the German Confederation
 Frankfurt Parliament (German National Assembly founded during the revolutions of 1848)
 Rural district of Frankfurt, a rural district (Landkreis) in the Prussian province of Hesse-Nassau (1885–1910)
 Frankfurt Urban Environs Authority (Umlandverband Frankfurt) (1975–2001); See Kelsterbach
 Frankfurt Airport
 Frankfurt Stock Exchange
 Eintracht Frankfurt, a German sports club
 Frankfurt School, of social theory and research and of philosophy

People
 Akiva Frankfurt ( 1597), German poet and rabbi
 Harry Frankfurt (b. 1929), professor of philosophy at Princeton University
 Suzie Frankfurt (1931–2005), American interior decorator

Other uses
 SMS Frankfurt, a German light cruiser warship
 SS Frankfurt, a German steamship
 Frankfurt (icebreaker), an inland icebreaker built for the German waterways and shipping office 
 Frankfurt plane, a special plane in the human skull
 Cocktail frankfurt, a miniature saveloy sausage
 Frankfurt Seamount, a seamount named after the German steamship

See also
 Frankfurt Trade Fair
 Frankfurt Book Fair
 Frankfurt Motor Show
 Frankfurter (disambiguation)
 Frank N. Furter  
 Frankfort (disambiguation)
 Frankford (disambiguation)

zh:法蘭克福 (消歧義)#德國